The first season of the  police procedural drama series Hawaii Five-0 premiered on CBS on September 20, 2010, for the 2010–11 television season in the United States. Production began for the pilot on February 18, 2010. CBS gave a full series order on May 19, 2010, and later ordered a full 24-episode season on October 21, 2010. The season concluded on May 16, 2011.

The series centers on the "Five-0", a specialized task force established by the Hawaiian Governor that investigates a wide series of crimes on the islands, including murder, terrorism and human trafficking. The series stars Alex O'Loughlin, Scott Caan, Daniel Dae Kim, and Grace Park. Taryn Manning receives an "Also starring" credit for three episodes before departing the series in the thirteenth episode of the season.

The first season ranked number 22 for the 2010–11 United States television season, had an average of 11.96 million viewers, and received mostly positive reviews. "Kai e'e", the fifteenth episode of the season, holds the record for the most watched Hawaii Five-0 episode in the series history with 19.34 million viewers. In addition, the series premiere holds the record for second-most-watched episode with 14.20 million. Hawaii Five-0 received generally positive reviews from critics and became one of CBS' top rated programs. It was renewed for a second season on May 18, 2011, which premiered on September 19, 2011.

Cast and characters

Main cast
 Alex O'Loughlin as Lieutenant Commander Steven "Steve" McGarrett, United States Navy Reserve
 Scott Caan as Detective Sergeant Daniel "Danny" "Danno" Williams, Honolulu Police Department
 Daniel Dae Kim as Detective Lieutenant Chin Ho Kelly, Honolulu Police Department
 Grace Park as Officer Kono Kalakaua, Honolulu Police Department
 Taryn Manning as Mary Ann McGarrett

Recurring

 James Marsters as Victor Hesse
 Jean Smart as Governor Pat Jameson
 Teilor Grubbs as Grace Williams
 Taylor Wily as Kamekona Tupuola
 Will Yun Lee as Sang Min Sooh
 Michelle Borth as Lieutenant Catherine Rollins, United States Navy
 Dennis Chun as HPD Sergeant Duke Lukela
 Masi Oka as Dr. Max Bergman, Chief Medical Examiner
 Claire van der Boom as Rachel Edwards
 Mark Dacascos as Wo Fat
 Larisa Oleynik as Jenna Kaye

Guest stars

 Norman Reedus as Anton Hesse
 Andrea Bowen as Amy
 Sean "Diddy" Combs as Reggie Cole
 Dane Cook as Matthew Williams
 Selita Ebanks as Lisa
 Patrick Gallagher as Carlos Bagoyo
 Balthazar Getty as Walton Dawkins
 Kelly Hu as Laura Hills
 Nasir "Nas" Jones as Gordon Smith
 Nick Lachey as Tyler
 Joanna Levesque as Courtney Russell
 Robert Loggia as Ed McKay
 Vanessa Minnillo as Susan
 Masaharu Morimoto as himself
 William Sadler as John McGarrett
 Jason Scott Lee as Detective Kaleo
 Kevin Sorbo as Carlton Bass
 Rick Springfield as Renny Sinclair
 Peter Stormare as Drago Zankovic
 Cary-Hiroyuki Tagawa as Hiro Noshimuri
 Joshua Dallas as Ben Bass
 Justin David Ross as Swat Guy

Episodes

The number in the "No. overall" column refers to the episode's number within the overall series, whereas the number in the "No. in season" column refers to the episode's number within this particular season. With the exception of "Pilot" the titles of each episode are in the Hawaiian language, though its English translations are directly underneath. "Production Code" refers to the order in which the episodes were produced. "U.S. viewers (millions)" refers to the number of viewers in the United States in millions who watched the episode as it was aired.

Production

Development
CBS initially announced that a pilot for a possible Hawaii Five-O reboot had been ordered into production on February 18, 2010. Len Wiseman was announced as the director a few days later. Based on the strength of the pilot, the network ordered Hawaii Five-0 to series on May 19, 2010. The series premiered on September 20, 2010, and after five episodes aired, CBS gave the show a full season order on October 21. The first season was executive produced by the three co-creators Alex Kurtzman, Roberto Orci and Peter M. Lenkov, with the latter serving as head writer and day-to-day showrunner. Len Wiseman also executive produced the pilot episode, which he directed. Brad Turner, Sarah Goldfinger, J. R. Orci, Elwood Reid and Paul Zbyszewski all served as co-executive producers along with Carol Barbee and Shane Salerno, who were consulting producers. The season's twenty-four episodes had thirteen different directors. Brad Turner accumulated the most credits with eight episodes, including the season finale. Matt Earl Beesley directed three episodes while Duane Clark and Chris Fisher directed two each. The remaining eight episodes were directed by Paul Edwards, Alex Zakrzewski, James Whitmore, Jr., Elodie Keene, Frederick E. O. Toye, Eric Laneuville, Larry Teng and Steve Boyum. Filming of the season concluded on April 14, 2011. The season concluded on May 16, 2011. A day earlier, on May 15, 2011, CBS announced that the show would be renewed for a second season that premiered on September 19, 2011.

Casting
Daniel Dae Kim was the first to be cast in the series on February 8, 2010, to play Chin Ho Kelly, an ex-cop trained by Steve McGarrett's father. Several days later on February 10 it was announced that Alex O'Loughlin joined as Steve McGarrett. Taryn Manning also joined the cast as Mary Ann McGarrett, Steve's sister. Actress Grace Park was announced to be starring on March 1, 2010, as rookie detective Kona "Kono" Kalakaua. Although in the original series, the character of Kono was male, the reboot series swapped the cop's gender in order to steer clear of a task force void of women. Scott Caan was the final member join the series on March 5, 2010, cast as Danny "Danno" Williams. On December 22, 2010, it was announced that Taryn Manning would be departing the series. She was originally expected to appear in the first four episodes and then recur throughout the season however, her only appearance in "Pilot" ended up being a deleted scene and her first appearance broadcast on television did not come until episode four. Manning's third and final episode as a main cast member was "Ke Kinohi" but she makes guest appearances in subsequent seasons. On September 3, 2010, it was reported that Jean Smart had been cast as Governor Pat Jameson Masi Oka appeared as guest star playing the chief medical examiner Max Bergman. It was reported that Mark Dacascos would be starring as Wo Fat on November 3, 2010. Michelle Borth had a recurring role in the season as Lieutenant Rollins, Steve McGarrett's girlfriend. Larisa Oleynik was cast in a recurring role, as ex-CIA analyst Jenna Kaye, with the option to become a series regular in the second season. Claire van der Boom appeared in a recurring role as Rachel Edwards, Danny's ex-wife.  Dennis Chun, son of Kam Fong Chun who played Chin Ho Kelly on the original series, guest starred in multiple episodes as Honolulu Police Department Sergeant Duke Lukela.

Release and marketing
The pilot episode was originally released as an advance screening at Queen's Surf Beach in Waikiki on September 13, 2010. One week later, the season began airing on television on September 20, in the 10 p.m. (ET) timeslot on Mondays, on the 42nd anniversary the original show premiered. The fifteenth episode, "Kai eʻe", aired as a special episode following an AFC Championship Game on Sunday, January 23, 2011. The season finale, "Oiaʻiʻo", aired on May 16, 2011, at the same Monday timeslot.

Reception

Awards and nominations
The first season was nominated for seven awards, two of which were won. The season was voted "Favourite New TV Drama" at the 37th People's Choice Awards. Keith Power and Brian Tyler also won the series a Broadcast Music, Inc. (BMI) award. Scott Cann was nominated for a 68th Golden Globe Awards for Best Supporting Actor – Series, Miniseries or Television Film; Glee actor Chris Colfer became the winner of the award. Series stunt coordinator Jeff David Cadiente was nominated for a 63rd Primetime Emmy Awards for Outstanding Stunt Coordination in the episode "Ua Hiki Mai Kapalena Pau", but lost to cable crime drama Southland. The first season was also nominated for three 2011 Teen Choice Awards; the season for Choice TV Show: Action, Daniel Dae Kim for Choice TV Actor: Action, and Grace Park for Choice TV Actress: Action. They lost to NCIS: Los Angeles, Nikita actor Shane West, and NCIS: Los Angeles actress Linda Hunt, respectively.

Critical response
The season was met with generally positive reviews from critics. R. L. Shaffer of IGN rated the season eight out of ten, signifying a "great" season. Shaffer stated that although it was not "particularly refreshing," the season was "damn good, with great cinematography, solid performances and slick, stylized action and drama." Dave Trumbore of Collider stated "The new Five-O plays like an action-packed combination of The A-Team's antics with the realism of The Shield. Though season one doesn't choose to go nearly as dark as many episodes of The Shield did, Alex O'Loughlin brings his physical presence and stunt training from that series into Five-O." Trumbore was also receptive towards the action sequences, which he felt was "one main sell of the show." Stuart Galbraith of DVD Talk had "many criticisms" with the season, but liked some aspects of the show because "clearly there's an attempt to draw from the best elements of the original series."

Ratings
The season premiered with 14.2 million viewers and a 3.9/11 ratings share among adults 18–49. Although the show was a highly rated new show, ratings were down from the premiere of CSI: Miami  season eight, which occupied the same time slot the previous year. Ratings hit an all-time high with its fifteenth episode, "Kai ee", which was watched by 19.34 million viewers and garnered a 5.6 ratings share with adults 18–49. A ratings low came with the penultimate episode, "Ua Hiki Mai Kapalena Pau", which earned 9.45 million viewers. The finale jumped by almost a million viewers and was seen by 10.41 million people. The season included the second largest gains in Digital video recorder (DVR) viewership from the 2010–11 season, behind Modern Family. It gained an average of 3.3 million more from live viewing. For the first season, Hawaii Five-0 was the 22nd most seen show in total viewership, averaging 11.96 million viewers. It was also the 33rd most seen show in the 18–49 demographic, with a 3.3 rating.

Home video release
The DVD box set of the first season was first released by CBS DVD and Paramount Home Entertainment in the United States (Region 1) on September 20, 2011, the United Kingdom (Region 2) on September 26, 2011, and Australia (Region 4) on December 1, 2011. The season was also released on Blu-ray in the US and UK on the same day as their DVD counterparts. The season box set consists of six discs, featuring all 24 episodes as well as bonus material including behind the scenes footage, deleted scenes, and audio commentaries on two episodes.

References

External links
 
 
 List of Hawaii Five-0 episodes at The Futon Critic
 

2010 American television seasons
2011 American television seasons
Hawaii Five-0 (2010 TV series) seasons
Works about the Serbian Mafia